The Estates of Languedoc was the provincial assembly for the province of Languedoc during the ancien regime, during which time it was a pays d'états.

History

Medieval

Modern

Sources

Notes

Local government of the Ancien Régime